Sean "Masher" Dodd is a British professional boxer. He held the Commonwealth lightweight title from 2017 to 2018 and challenged twice for the British lightweight title in 2015 and 2016.

Professional career
Dodd made his professional debut on 3 March 2012, scoring a fourth-round technical knockout (TKO) over Giuseppe Daparto at the Northgate Arena in Chester.

After winning his first eight fights, two by stoppage, he fought Andy Townend for the vacant Central Area super-featherweight title on 10 May 2014 at the Doncaster Dome in Doncaster. Dodd suffered the first defeat of his career via seventh-round TKO.

He bounced back from defeat with two points decision (PTS) victories against Liam Richards in March and Gary Buckland in September, before challenging Scott Cardle for the British lightweight title on 7 November 2015 at the Echo Arena in Liverpool. Dodd suffered the second defeat of his career via TKO in the twelfth and final round. At the time of the stoppage, he was ahead on two of the judges' scorecards at 107–103 and 105–104, while the third judge had it 105–104 in favour of Cardle. The pair would meet again in a rematch five months later on 2 April 2016, again at the Echo Arena. In what some described as a controversial decision, Cardle retained his title through a majority draw (MD), with two judges scoring the bout even at 114–114 while the third scored it 116–112 in favour of Cardle.

Following the draw against Cardle, he faced Pasquale Di Silvio for the vacant WBC International lightweight title on 29 May 2016 at Goodison Park in Liverpool. Dodd captured his first professional title by unanimous decision (UD) over ten rounds, with two judges scoring the bout 98–92 and the third scoring it 97–93. 

He went on to successfully defend his title via split decision (SD) against Francesco Patera in October, as part of the undercard for Tony Bellew's WBC cruiserweight title defence against BJ Flores, before facing Lee Appleyard for the vacant Commonwealth lightweight title. The bout took place on 22 April 2017 at the Echo Arena. Dodd defeated Appleyard via UD with the judges' scorecards reading 117–112, 117–113 and 116–113. After a TKO win in a non-title fight against Antonio Horvatic in August, he made the first defence of his Commonwealth title a month later against Tom Stalker on 30 September 2017 at the Echo Arena. Dodd retained the title via UD over twelve rounds, with all three judges scoring the bout 118–111. His second title defence came on 21 April 2018 against Tommy Coyle at the Echo Arena. In a fight that saw the champion knocked to the canvas once in the fourth round and again in the sixth, Dodd suffered the third loss of his career, losing his Commonwealth title via sixth-round TKO after the referee called a halt to the bout to save Dodd from further punishment.

Following defeat to Coyle, Dodd faced 2016 Olympian Joe Cordina on 4 August 2018 at the Ice Arena in Cardiff, Wales. The fight would allow Dodd to challenge for the Commonwealth title once again after Coyle relinquished his claim, with Cordina's WBA International lightweight title also on the line. Dodd suffered his second consecutive defeat, losing via UD over twelve rounds with scores of 120–109, 119–109 and 117–112. He suffered a third consecutive defeat three months later against Jordan Ellison in November, before scoring two decision wins in 2019; Ibrar Riyaz by PTS in October and Tom Farrell by technical decision (TD) in November after Farrell suffered a cut from an accidental clash of heads.

Professional boxing record

References

External links

Living people
Year of birth missing (living people)
Date of birth missing (living people)
British male boxers
Sportspeople from Birkenhead
Super-featherweight boxers
Lightweight boxers
Light-welterweight boxers
Commonwealth Boxing Council champions